The Folly of Anne is a 1914 American short drama film directed by  John B. O'Brien.

Cast
 Elmer Clifton
 Donald Crisp
 Lillian Gish
 W. E. Lawrence (as William E. Lawrence)

See also
 List of American films of 1914
 Lillian Gish filmography

References

External links
 

1914 films
1914 short films
American silent short films
1914 drama films
American black-and-white films
Silent American drama films
Films directed by John B. O'Brien
1910s American films
1910s English-language films